25th Karbala Division was a division of the Islamic Revolutionary Guard Corps. It covered the Mazandaran province, which also included Golestan province back then.

It was first officially organized as the 2nd Karbala Brigade during Iran–Iraq War, and was later expanded into a division.

According to Mohsen Rezaei, after a series of unsuccessful Iranian offensive operations in late stages of the Iran–Iraq War, it was decided to form several new brigades in the IRGC, and one new "special" division. The Karbala Division was later selected to be the special division. A team consisted of Hossein Basir, Mohammad Hassan Tusi, and other commanders were tasked to organize this division, and Morteza Ghorbani was appointed as its commander. Since then, the division was called 25th Karbala Special Division. The division was employed in the Operation Dawn-8, which was successful in capturing the strategic Al-Faw Peninsula. According to Iranian sources, Iraqi General Maher Abd al-Rashid had described the unit as a "black scorpion" that should be destroyed, possibly a reference to their black frogman suits during the operation.

Sepah-e Karbala 
The division was merged with the Basij of Mazandaran Province to form the Mazandaran Karbala Provincial Corps during the rearrangement of the IRGC units in 2008.

References

External links
 How was the 31st Ashura Division formed? mashreghnews.ir
 31st Ashura Division defamoghaddas.ir 

Military units and formations of Army of the Guardians of the Islamic Revolution
Karbala Division 25
Karbala Division 25